Lake Sinclair is a man-made lake in central Georgia near Milledgeville. It is operated by Georgia Power.

The lake was named after Benjamin W. Sinclair, a Georgia Power official.

Location 
Located in the central region of Georgia, on the Oconee River, Lake Sinclair stretches through the counties of Baldwin, Hancock, and Putnam. Lake Sinclair was created in 1953. The lake is made up of a  area of water and provides both electricity and recreation. Milledgeville, Georgia, is the largest city on Lake Sinclair, though most of the lake is located in Putnam County.

Recreation 
Lake Sinclair is largely used by lake residents and people who live and house their boats, watercraft and RVs on the lake. There is easy access to the water with two public boat ramps provided by Georgia Power. There are also marinas and boat storage areas located on the lake. Other areas of access to the lake includes Oconee Springs Park. Lake Sinclair is the site of several fishing tournaments—both local and national—and attracts fishermen of various skill levels and interest. Visitors find fall and winter fishing at Lake Sinclair a special treat due to the mild climate and activity. There is also a popular fishing area below the dam near Milledgeville. Several recreation areas, such as Oconee Springs Park and Rocky Creek Park, provide day-use facilities that include picnic tables, grills, boat ramp and a small beach. There is camping and even cabin rentals provided at Oconee Springs Park, but not Rocky Creek Park.

Hydroelectric generating station 
Lake Sinclair was created in 1953 when the waters of the Oconee river were dammed to create a  hydroelectric generating station. Development of this lake as a recreational area began through a planned cooperative program. Participants included the Oconee Area Planning and Development Commission, the U.S. Forest Service, The Georgia Game and Fish Commission, Georgia Power Company and several independent businesses.

Tributaries 
Lake Sinclair is fed by several creeks and rivers, including Beaver Dam, Crooked, Rooty, Sandy Run, Shoulder Bone, Potato, Island, Rocky, Nancy Branch, Reedy Branch, and Little River.

Sinclair Dam 

Notes

Reservoirs in Georgia (U.S. state)
Protected areas of Baldwin County, Georgia
Protected areas of Hancock County, Georgia
Protected areas of Putnam County, Georgia
Bodies of water of Baldwin County, Georgia
Bodies of water of Hancock County, Georgia
Bodies of water of Putnam County, Georgia
1953 establishments in Georgia (U.S. state)